Onesimus (late 1600s–1700s) was an African man who was instrumental in the mitigation of the impact of a smallpox outbreak in Boston, Massachusetts. His birth name is unknown. He was enslaved and, in 1706, was given to the New England Puritan minister Cotton Mather, who renamed him. Onesimus introduced Mather to the principle and procedure of inoculation to prevent the disease, which laid the foundation for the development of vaccines. After a smallpox outbreak began in Boston in 1721, Mather used this knowledge to advocate for inoculation in the population, a practice that eventually spread to other colonies. In a 2016 Boston magazine survey, Onesimus was declared one of the "Best Bostonians of All Time".

Early life and enslavement 
Onesimus's name at birth and place of birth are not known with certainty. He was first documented as living in the colonies in 1706, having been brought to North America as a slave. In December of that year, he was given as a gift by a church congregation to Cotton Mather, their Puritan minister of North Church, as well as a prominent figure in the Salem Witch Trials. Mather renamed him after a first-century AD slave mentioned in the Bible. The name, "Onesimus" means "useful, helpful, or profitable". 

Mather referred to the ethnicity of Onesimus as "Guaramantee", which may refer to the Coromantee (also known as Akan people of modern Ghana). Mather saw Onesimus as highly intelligent and educated him in reading and writing with the Mather family (for context, according to biographer Kathryn Koo, at that time literacy was primarily associated with religious instruction, and writing as means of note-taking and conducting business).

Inoculation advocacy and controversy 

In 1716 or shortly before, Onesimus had described to Mather the process of inoculation that had been performed on him and others in his society in Africa (as Mather reported in a letter): "People take Juice of Small-Pox; and Cut the Skin, and put in a drop." In the book, African Medical Knowledge, the Plain Style, and Satire in the 1721 Boston Inoculation Controversy, Kelly Wisecup wrote that Onesimus is believed to have been inoculated at some point before being sold into slavery or during the slave trade, as he most likely traveled from the West Indies to Boston. The variolation method of inoculation was long practiced in Africa among sub-Saharan people. The practice was widespread among enslaved colonial people from many regions of Africa and, throughout the slave trade in the Americas, slave communities continued the practice of inoculation despite regional origin. 

Mather followed Onesimus's medicinal advice because, as Margot Minardi writes, "inferiority had not yet been indelibly written onto the bodies of Africans." Additionally, Mather believed that disease, specifically smallpox, was a spiritual and physical punishment, so he saw a cure as "God's providential gift", as well as a means of receiving recognition from New England society and reestablishing the influence of religious figures in politics. 

When Boston experienced a smallpox outbreak in 1721, Mather promoted inoculation as protection against it, citing Onesimus and African folk medicine as the source of the procedure. His advocacy for inoculation met resistance from those suspicious of African medicine. Doctors, ministers, laymen, and Boston city officials argued that the practice of inoculating healthy individuals would spread the disease and that it was immoral to interfere with the working of divine providence. Also, Mather was ridiculed publicly for relying on the testimony of a slave. It was commonly anticipated that enslaved Africans would attempt an overthrow of white society, therefore, the medicinal wisdom of Onesimus was met with severe mistrust and assumed to be a ploy to poison white citizens. The Acts and Resolves passed in Boston, which included race-based punishments and codes to prevent slave or servant uprisings (because Bostonians feared conspiracy and conflict), showed a society skeptical of African medicine. 

Nonetheless, a physician, Zabdiel Boylston, carried out the method Onesimus had described, which involved sticking a needle into a pustule from an infected person's body and scraping the infected needle across a healthy person's skin. Dr. Boylston first inoculated his six-year-old son and two of his slaves. A total of 280 individuals were inoculated during the 1721-22 Boston smallpox epidemic. The population of 280 inoculated patients experienced only six deaths (approx. 2.2 percent), compared to 844 deaths among the 5,889 non-inoculated smallpox patients (approx. 14.3 percent). An inscription on his tomb incorrectly identifies Boylston as the "first" to have introduced the practice of inoculation into America. Recognition for this contribution by Onesimus to medical science came in 2016 however, when he was placed among the 100 Best Bostonians of All Time by Boston magazine and, when historian Ted Widmer of Macaulay Honors College at CUNY in New York noted that “Onesimus reversed many of [the colonists’] traditional racial assumptions... [h]e had a lot more knowledge medically than most of the Europeans in Boston at that time.”

Personal life 
Onesimus earned independent wages and afforded a household for himself and the wife he took while serving the Mather family. It is unclear whether his wife was a free woman. They had two children, both of whom died before they were ten years old. His son, Onesimulus, died in 1714. Katy, his second child, died due to consumption. Culturally, Puritans believed that children "belonged to God", and parents were admonished to be prepared for the loss of a child. Likely, this belief was connected to the fact that, between 1640 and 1759, one in four children died before the age of ten. After their deaths, Mather attempted to convert Onesimus to Christianity, overtures Onesimus rejected. Mather saw his inability to convert his slave as his failure as a Puritan evangelist and head of his household, as Onesimus’ refusal was supposed to bring God's displeasure on the Mather family. Onesimus was catechized in his free time, as Mather attempted to convert him to the Christian faith. Onesimus’ refusal to convert led to Mather's unhappiness with his presence in the household. Mather's diary reports "stubborn behavior" from Onesimus following the death of his children. 

In 1716, Onesimus attempted to buy his freedom from Mather, raising funds to "purchase" another enslaved man, named Obadiah, to take his place. Mather placed conditions on his release, however, requiring that he remain available to perform work in the Mather household at their command and return five pounds that Mather claimed that Onesimus had stolen from him. The proximate cause of Onesimus’ release is unknown; some assert that it was the alleged theft, but Mather's diaries better support Mather's inability to convert Onesimus as his primary motivation to allow Onesimus to purchase his freedom.

Legacy 
Boston and London in 1726 and 1722, respectively, performed trials on citizens and, on average, inoculation decreased the mortality rate from 17% to 2% of the infected population.

In 1796, the inoculation methodology Onesimus introduced was replaced by Edward Jenner's development of vaccination for smallpox and cowpox. Thereafter, vaccination became compulsory in Wales and England and variolation became banned for its side effects. In 1980, the World Health Organization declared that smallpox had been completely eradicated due to global immunization efforts, making it the first and only human infectious disease for which this has been accomplished.

In the 2016 Boston magazine survey, Onesimus was declared number 52 on a list of the "Best Bostonians of All Time".

Footnotes

References

Works cited

People from colonial Boston
People from North End, Boston
17th-century births
18th-century deaths
Smallpox eradication
Public health
18th-century American slaves